Eriogonum elongatum, commonly known as longstem buckwheat or wand buckwheat, is a species of wild buckwheat native to coastal southern and Baja California.

Description 
Its leaves and stem are generally tomentose. It has a haploid number of n=34.

Habitat 
As with many other Eriogonum species, Eriogonum elongatum is a bodenvag species, tolerant of a relatively wide pH range of 5–8.2, and is tolerant of serpentinite soils that are common throughout its range, though it is not endemic to serpentine-derived soils.

Eriogonum elongatum supports several organisms in its habitat, including native bees, parasitic and predatory insects, and butterflies. Hosted butterflies include the Mormon metalmark (Apodemia mormo), Bramble Hairstreak Butterfly (Callophrys perplexa), Comstock's Hairstreak (Callophrys sheridanii comstocki), Bernardino Dotted-Blue (Euphilotes bernardino), Small Dotted-Blue (Philotiella speciosa), Acmon Blue (Plebejus acmon), and Lupine Blue (Plebejus lupini).

Varieties 
Eriogonum elongatum has three described varieties:

 Eriogonum elongatum var. areorivum
 Eriogonum elongatum var. elongatum
 Eriogonum elongatum var. vollmeri

References 

elongatum
Flora of California
Flora of Mexico
Species described in 1844